The Jumping International de France 2011 was the 2011 edition of Jumping International de France, the French official show jumping horse show, in the Stadium François André in La Baule-Escoublac. It was held as CSIO 5*.

The first horse show were held 1931 in La Baule, since 1960 La Baule is the location of the French official show jumping horse show (CSIO = Concours de Saut International Officiel). The 2011 edition of Jumping International de France was held between May 12, 2011 and May 15, 2011.

FEI Nations Cup of France 
The 2011 FEI Nations Cup of France was part of the Jumping International de France 2011. It was the first competition of the 2011 FEI Nations Cup and was held at Friday, May 13, 2011 at 4:20 pm. The competing teams were: Germany, Great Britain, the United States of America, Belgium, Denmark, Ireland, France and the Netherlands.

The competition was a show jumping competition with two rounds and optionally one jump-off. The height of the fences were up to 1.60 meters. All teams were allowed to start in the second round. The competition was endowed with 200,000 €.

(grey penalties points do not count for the team result)

Grand Prix Longines de la ville de la Baule 
The Grand Prix de la ville de la Baule was the mayor competition of the Jumping International de France 2011. It was held at Sunday, May 15, 2011 at 11:45 am. The competition was a show jumping competition with one round and one jump-off, the height of the fences will be up to 1.60 meters. 

The main sponsor of the Grand Prix de la ville de la Baule was Longines. The Grand Prix was endowed with 200,000 €.

(Top 5 of 46 Competitors)

References

External links 
 official website
 2011 results

Jumping International de France
Jumping International de France
Jumping International de France